James Garfield Harper (15 August 1884 – 23 June 1967) was an Australian rules footballer who played with Geelong in the Victorian Football League (VFL).

Notes

External links 

1884 births
1967 deaths
Australian rules footballers from Bendigo
Geelong Football Club players